The Last of the Baskets was a British television situation comedy produced by Granada and starring Arthur Lowe that ran for two series in the early 1970s. It was written by John Stevenson, with one episode (Series 2, Episode 5, "The Hound of the Baskets") written by Andy Mayer.

Created by John Stevenson, the programme was about a factory worker Clifford Basket (played by Ken Jones) who inherited a title of the Earl of Clogborough, the remaining estate of which is a rundown mansion at Little Clogborough-in-the-Marsh and a faithful servant Bodkin played by Arthur Lowe.

Cast
Redvers Bodkin - Arthur Lowe
Clifford Basket - Ken Jones
Mrs Alfreda Basket - Patricia Hayes

Episodes

Series 1 (1971)

Series 2 (1972)

References

1970s British sitcoms
1971 British television series debuts
1972 British television series endings
ITV sitcoms
Television series by ITV Studios
Television shows produced by Granada Television
English-language television shows